Khalid Mahmood is a Pakistani civil servant and the former chairman of the Pakistan Cricket Board (PCB) between 1998 and 1999. He 1967 batch of Central Superior Services. He has also served as the provincial ombudsman of the Punjab, Pakistan.

He was removed from the office after Pakistani defeat in 1999 Cricket World Cup.

References

Place of birth missing (living people)
Pakistan Cricket Board Presidents and Chairmen
Pakistani civil servants
Living people
Year of birth missing (living people)